Face the Music is the fifth studio album by Electric Light Orchestra (ELO). It was released in September 1975 by United Artists Records and on 14 November 1975 in the United Kingdom by Jet Records. The album moves away from the large-scale classical orchestrated sound from the previous album, Eldorado, in favour of more "radio-friendly" pop/rock songs, though the string sections are still very prominent. The new sound proved successful for the group as Face the Music was the first ELO album to go platinum.

Overview
By January 1975, bass player Mike de Albuquerque and cellist Mike Edwards had left the band during the Eldorado recording sessions and subsequent tour, respectively. Bass player Kelly Groucutt and classically trained cellist Melvyn Gale both joined the band as their replacements. Following the conclusion of the Eldorado's European leg of the tour, the band began recording the new album at Musicland Studios in Munich, Germany. ELO had frequently opened for Deep Purple for the initial North American leg of the Eldorado Tour, and Deep Purple had recommended Musicland to ELO. This was the first time ELO recorded at Musicland and the band would later return to record most of the future albums here due to frontman Jeff Lynne's great fondness for it and his working relationship with sound engineer Mack.

Lynne, also the band's sole songwriter, wanted to move towards more tunes that would be memorable rather than the usual progressive-rock style of the group's first three albums and straight symphonic sound of the Eldorado. New measures were taken to ensure a more-complex but satisfying sound, such as backing female vocalists of Ellie Greenwich, Susan Collins, Nancy O'Neill and Margaret Raymond, a choir, and the band's string trio of Mik Kaminski, Hugh McDowell and Melvyn Gale mixed into the backing 30-piece string section and also allowing them to perform some of the solos on the records. While Lynne was the lead vocalist for a vast majority of the band's songs, Kelly Groucutt sang lead vocals on "Poker" and (alternating with Lynne) on "Nightrider", giving the tracks a dynamic sound. The backing orchestra was recorded separately from the band's initial sessions, being recorded instead at De Lane Lea Studios in London, England.

The back cover of the record sleeve shows the members of the band with their faces pressed against a glass panel, supposedly watching the "electrocution" depicted on the front cover. Richard Tandy is looking away, because he didn't like the idea and didn't want to participate.

The new lineup introduced for this album became a stabilized and iconic one for the band's next 5 years and has been called by ELO fans the "classic line-up".

Songs

Side One

"Fire on High" 

"Fire on High" is the opening track of the album.

It begins with a haunting synthesizer (provided by Richard Tandy) playing a repeating broken chord of E♭, A, C, A along with a backing choir. The backing orchestration is minimal, featuring small bits here and there during which a "knocking" sound suddenly appears and fades out before a baritone voice fades in speaking a back-masked message. Drummer, Bev Bevan provided the voice and when the record is played backwards, he exclaims "The music is reversible but time is not. Turn back, turn back, turn back, turn back". This inclusion was a joke by Jeff Lynne, who faced mild controversy from a Christian fundamentalist group, accusing him of including backwards Satanic messages on the track "Eldorado" from their previous album of the same name. The orchestration grows as a choir chants "Hallelujah" similar to the fashion of Handel's "Messiah". The haunting opening concludes with the backing orchestra repeating the same broken chord as the synthesizer before transitioning into a more symphonic-rock bridge accompanied by the drums. The synthesizer plays an arpeggio during which the strings play riffs. Following this, Lynne provides a guitar-solo and the strings follow after. The song suddenly shifts to a rock sound with a prominent acoustic guitar riff where Kelly Groucutt joins on the bass guitar. Kaminski, McDowell and Gale all solo together on this rock-section. The rock section is followed by another symphonic-rock bridge with another guitar solo which, again, leads into a rock section. The choir at the end of the track chants "Fire on high" several times, providing the song the only set of true lyrics.

Jeff Lynne later remarked the entire concept of the song started with the idea of classical symphonic sound would collide with a rock and roll sound.

"Fire on High" was released as the b-side to the U.S.'s "Sweet Talkin' Woman" single and the U.K.'s "Livin' Thing" single.

"Waterfall" 
"Waterfall" is the second track on the album and the shortest track on side one.

Opening with an orchestra intro and guitar solo, "Waterfall" is a slower and softer song in contrast to its predecessor. Lynne sings the lead vocals while Groucutt sings harmony vocals on the chorus. Kaminski, McDowell and Gale all play together mixed with the backing orchestra in the song's entirety, adding an extra layer of orchestration. The guitar and orchestral outro fade into the orchestra opening to "Evil Woman". The song is written in D Major.

The song was not released as a single anywhere with the exception of France and Australia where it became a minor hit.

Jeff Lynne has gone on record saying that "Waterfall" is one of his favorite songs in the ELO catalogue.

The full instrumental (save for the guitar and string fade in) of this song was released as a bonus track for the 2006 Face the Music reissue. It includes a small section of in-studio banter and Lynne doing a count-in and also includes a slightly extended studio ending.

"Evil Woman" 

"Evil Woman" is the third track on the album.

The song was written by Lynne in a matter of just a few minutes near the end of the Face the Music studio sessions in June 1975. Originally supposed to be a filler track to give the album a longer runtime, it quickly became a worldwide hit and was released as a single only a month after the album's release. The main song features a more disco-like rhythm (aside from the short orchestral interlude on the album version) with Tandy's piano riff and Lynne's acoustic guitar playing the chords Am, Em7 and Dm7. The female backing vocalists sang on the track during the "ha ha" pieces, the "hey hey hey" in the middle section of the song and the chorus, alongside Lynne and Groucutt. The chorus featured an iconic riff of the clavinet (played by Tandy). The second verse includes the ELO string players playing the string rhythm section behind Lynne's vocals. The lyrics "There's a hole in my head where the rain comes in" is a reference to The Beatles' song "Fixing a Hole". The final chord of the opening section (You made a fool of me) is actually mixed into "Fire on High" during the back-masked message.

The middle section features a piano solo by Tandy and a string ascending melody together before cutting an unusual string break. This break is actually a reversed cut of a string crescendo from the next track "Nightrider" put onto the track merely because, as Lynne described it, "[the two songs] were in the same key." Lynne later remarked how amazed he was on how well the transition fit into place.

An additional verse was written for the song but was cut from the final mix as proven in the stripped mix of the song which is found as a bonus track on the reissue of the album.

"Nightrider" 

"Nightrider" is the fourth and final song on side one of the album. It was released as a single but did not chart unlike the other two album singles.

The track is unique for featuring both Lynne and Groucutt (though alternating) singing the lead vocals. It starts with a moog chord progression and string backing. The first verse has the ELO string trio playing the solo bits. The drums, guitar and bass all join on the pre-chorus ("Hold on, nightrider") along with backing harmonies from Greenwich, Collins, O'Neill and Raymond. Just before each chorus, there is a small orchestral and choir break, the third of which is extended and includes a string crescendo which was later reversed and used on "Evil Woman".  Raymond later revealed on an ELO Facebook fan page that Lynne instructed the backing vocalists to emulate the sounds of the strings on the final verse for a specific sound, saying:"On the part where he sings 'desolation degradation row, etc.' listen in the background... You hear string, but its also our voices emulating the string parts... I thought that was simply genius on Jeff Lynne's part to come up with that. Vocals that emulate string parts." — Marge Raymond

Side Two

"Poker" 
"Poker" is the opening track to (and shortest track on) side two of the album and the fifth track overall.

The song is a fast-tempo guitar-rocker featuring Kelly Groucutt on both lead and harmony vocals, one of few times where Jeff Lynne does not sing the lead. Bev Bevan plays fast, bombastic drum fills in between verses and Richard Tandy provides a moog synthesizer arpeggio rhythm section. The middle section of the song slows down into a slow, bluesy bridge ("Play me another hand") with Tandy adding in some synthesizer fillers. Lynne's harmony vocals come in on the final verse of the song.

"Poker" was released as a b-side to the U.S.'s "Confusion" single and U.K.'s "Rockaria!" single.

"Strange Magic" 

"Strange Magic" is the sixth track on the album and second on side two. It was the second single lifted from Face the Music, being released in February 1976, though was not as successful as "Evil Woman".

The track opens with a 21-second orchestra intro before cutting to a guitar lick with a soft piano. The choruses feature Lynne solely singing "Strange magic" three times, before jumping an octave higher singing "Got a strange magic" along with Groucutt, Greenwich, Collins, O'Neill and Raymond on harmony vocals. Each chorus features more instrumentation than the previous: the first being just a guitar with a phaser effect, piano and mild percussion, the second having drums and an ascending string orchestration added and the third having more layers of strings. The bridge following the third chorus features some of the female singers singing "It's magic, it's magic, it's magic" and the final choruses include an additional different "Strange magic" melody done by the women. The album version fades into a back-masked reprise of the chorus of "Waterfall", ultimately leading into the next track "Down Home Town".

An oddity of the song is the fact that the guitar solo is played by Tandy rather than Lynne, the latter recalled:"I just couldn't work it out. It was such a long run with two fingers." — Jeff Lynne, interview with Uncle Joe BensonLynne also admitted in the Flashback liner notes that he wrote the song on various pianos in separate places while on tour in England with the band, presumably during the Eldorado tour.

Though drums are a feature used in the studio recording of the song, drummer Bev Bevan would leave his drum set and join Lynne and Groucutt on the front of the stage, playing tambourine and singing the baritone parts of the song during live performances.

"Down Home Town" 
"Down Home Town" is the seventh track on the album and the third on side two.

The song opens with a backmasked reprise of chorus of the track "Waterfall" but contrasts into an American folk-rock based sound. The ELO string trio has a greater influence on sound of this track, playing independently from the backing orchestra in a more fiddle-like fashion. Lynne sings the lead with a nasally, "Nashville hoedown" style. While the four female singers usually sang in unison, this track features four part harmonies during the "Look away" section and, according to Raymond, the four were also allowed to add small bits with Lynne's approval such as Raymond's line "Ooh, I feel you comin' down now." The song makes direct references to the "Land of Dixie". During the final verse, there is a lyrical reference to The Beatles' song "She Loves You" in "She loves you, no, no, no. Down home town."

"Down Home Town" was released as the b-side to U.S. "Last Train to London" single and the U.K.'s "The Diary of Horace Wimp" single.

"One Summer Dream" 

"One Summer Dream" is the eighth and final track on the album.

The song features an orchestral opening with Lynne singing with a soft tenor voice; the main verses and chorus feature Lynne on acoustic guitar with a phaser effect on it. Only Marge Raymond was featured on the track and sang the female chorus parts. The song includes a long fade of the lyrics "One summer dream", concluding the album.

Lynne's father, who had been vocally critical about Lynne's early albums admired the song and Lynne recalled that his father would hum the song.

Though a peaceful, easy-listening ballad, Lynne remarked on the Flashback notes that it was a "protest" song.

"One Summer Dream" was released as the b-side to the "Mr. Blue Sky" single.

Release
The singles "Evil Woman" and "Strange Magic" were the most commercial songs they had recorded up to that point. "Evil Woman" was a big hit in the UK and the US, embracing disco rhythms while still embodying ELO's classic sound. Lynne wrote the chords and melody of this song in only six minutes, making it his fastest feat of composition.

"Nightrider" became the third single from the album; despite an appearance on the UK chart television program Top of the Pops, it failed to chart.

Notwithstanding the success of the singles, the LP failed to chart in the UK. The album was remastered and released in September 2006 with bonus tracks.

Face the Music is generally seen by Lynne as the turning point for ELO as the success of the album and the singles "Evil Woman" and "Strange Magic" led to the band's popularity changed from minor popularity in America to major success (though it wouldn't be until their follow-up album A New World Record that launched them into global success).

Track listing
All songs written by Jeff Lynne.

Personnel
 Jeff Lynne – lead vocals, guitars, producer
 Bev Bevan – drums, percussion, spoken intro (backwards), backing vocals
 Richard Tandy – piano, clavinet, Moog, guitar, Wurlitzer electric piano, tack piano
 Kelly Groucutt – vocals, bass, backing vocals, lead vocals on "Poker", co-lead vocals on "Nightrider"
 Mik Kaminski – violin
 Hugh McDowell – cello
 Melvyn Gale – cello

Additional personnel 

 Ellie Greenwich – uncredited vocals
 Susan Collins – uncredited vocals
 Nancy O'Neill – uncredited vocals
 Margaret Raymond – uncredited vocals
Mack – engineer
 Jeff Lynne, Richard Tandy and Louis Clark – Orchestral and choral arrangements
 Orchestra conducted by Louis Clark
 Although Greenwich, Collins, O'Neill and Raymond are not credited as vocalists, the liner notes indicated 'special thanks' to them.

Charts and certifications

Weekly Charts

Year-End Charts

Certifications

References

External links
 Face the Music Remastered info at ftmusic

Electric Light Orchestra albums
Albums produced by Jeff Lynne
1975 albums
Epic Records albums
United Artists Records albums
Jet Records albums